The Baron de Hirsch Cemetery, also known as the Baron de Hirsch Affiliated Cemeteries, Baron de Hirsch United Cemeteries and Baron de Hirsch Memorial Park, is a Jewish cemetery located on the north side of De la Savane Street, between Mountain Sights Avenue and Kindersley Avenue in the Côte-des-Neiges neighborhood of Montreal, Quebec, Canada.

Since its establishment in 1892, an estimated 55,000 people have been interred in these grounds.

Notable graves
The cemetery contains sixteen war graves of Commonwealth service personnel: two from World War I and fourteen from World War II.

It also has the remains of poet A.M. Klein (1909–1972), Fred Rose (politician) (1907–1983), entrepreneur Ben Weider (1923–2008) and hockey player Larry Zeidel (1928–2014).

References

External links
 

Cemeteries in Montreal
Jewish cemeteries in Quebec
1892 establishments in Quebec
Côte-des-Neiges–Notre-Dame-de-Grâce
Jews and Judaism in Montreal